Fodé Moussa Sylla (born 31 July 1988 in Conakry) is a Guinean football player, who currently plays for Horoya AC.

Career
Sylla started his career with Sporting Club de Matoto and signed than 2002 with Horoya AC. He played until spring 2009 for Horoya before signed in October 2009 with Ghana Premier League club Liberty Professionals F.C. Sylla played with fellow man Naby Capi Soumah by Liberty Pro, who joined besides in the middle of 2009 from Guinean side Horoya AC to Liberty. He left in the November 2010 his Ghanaian club Liberty Professionals F.C. and returned to Horoya AC.

International 
He played 2011 two games for the Guinea national football team, by a tournament in Mozambique.

References

1988 births
Living people
Guinean footballers
Expatriate footballers in Ghana
Liberty Professionals F.C. players
Guinean expatriate footballers
Expatriate footballers in Thailand
Horoya AC players
Association football midfielders